Harpleia was a town of ancient Laconia. Pausanias writes that it was on Mount Taygetus but at the entrance of the plain, and 20 stadia from Dereium.

Its site is unlocated, the a connection with Xirokambi has been suggested.

References

Populated places in ancient Laconia
Former populated places in Greece
Lost ancient cities and towns